The 2015 Tegera Stockholm FIM Speedway Grand Prix was the 10th race of the 2015 Speedway Grand Prix season. It took place on September 26 at the Friends Arena in Stockholm, Sweden.

Riders 
First reserve Peter Kildemand replaced Jarosław Hampel, who had injured himself during the 2015 Speedway World Cup. The Speedway Grand Prix Commission also nominated Antonio Lindbäck as the wild card, and Fredrik Lindgren and Kim Nilsson both as Track Reserves.

Results 
The Grand Prix was won by Tai Woffinden, who beat Greg Hancock, Niels-Kristian Iversen and Maciej Janowski in the final. Hancock had initially top scored during the heats, but was beaten into second place in the final. Both riders finished with 16 points though, meaning Woffinden maintained his 25-point lead in the world title race with just two rounds remaining.

Heat details

The intermediate classification

References

See also 
 motorcycle speedway

2015 Speedway Grand Prix
2015 in Swedish motorsport